The politics of Mayotte takes place in a framework of a French overseas region and department, until 2011 an overseas collectivity. Local politics takes place in a parliamentary representative democratic setting whereby the President of the General Council is the head of government, of a multi-party system. Executive power is exercised by the government. 
The status of Mayotte changed in 2001 towards one very close to the status of the départements of mainland France, with the particular designation of collectivité départementale, although the island is still claimed by the Comoros. This change was approved by 73% in a referendum on Mayotte. After the constitutional reform of 2003 it became a collectivité d'outre-mer while keeping the title collectivité départementale de Mayotte. Mayotte became an overseas department of France (département d'outre-mer, DOM) on 31 March 2011 following the result of the March 2009 Mahoran status referendum, which was overwhelmingly approved by around 95% of voters.

Executive branch
The head of state is the President of France as represented by prefect Thierry Suquet. The head of government is President of the General Council Soibahadine Ibrahim Ramadani.

Legislative branch
The General Council (Conseil Général) has 19 members, elected for a three-year term in single seat constituencies.
The island is represented by one deputy in 
the National Assembly of France.

Political parties and elections